Bushbuckridge Local Municipality is a Local municipality in the Ehlanzeni District of Mpumalanga in South Africa. Commercial farming, which consists of pine /bluegum  plantations, tobacco, cotton, sub-tropical fruits and vegetables is practised in the municipality's countryside. The municipality includes the southern part of the Kruger National Park. Bushbuckridge is the largest local municipality in Mpumalanga in terms of land size.

History
The name Bushbuck Ridge was given because of the large herds of bushbuck found there in the 1880s, and the prominent WNW-ESE ridge in the southeastern part of the municipality. The town of Bushbuckridge grew around a trading store that opened in 1884. Prior to the colonial and apartheid era, the land known today as Bushbuckridge and Hazyview was well known as Mapulaneng, it has been home to the Mapulana people for centuries before the Tsonga people and the Swazi people were allowed to settled in the area during the reign of Mapulana chief Maripe Mashile. Mapulaneng was replaced during the white conquest and named Bushbuckridge. Mapulaneng proper stretches from the Eswatini border to Ermelo in the south, Olifants River (Lepelle) in the north, Lebombo Mountains in the east and also includes the whole town of Hazyview, Nelspruit, Sabie, Graskop, Hoedspruit, Barberton, Lydenburg and Dullstroom in the west. In Sepulana, Mapulaneng means "Place of the Mapulana people"; the tribe derive their name from their founding leader, Lepulana who later changed his name to Chiloane. Mapulana are descendants of Morolong and their origin can be traced back to Kgalagadi before they settled in Thaba Chueu, in what is today eastern Lesotho and Shakwaneng (Carolina) in the 1500s. Mapulana of Matshwe I got their name from their leader Pulane and they are of Amazizi of Nguni origin and they join the other Mapulana of Mohlomi at Thaba Chueu after the death of their leader Tsosane. Mapulana successfully defended the area from Swazi armies who they annihilated at the battle of Moholoholo in December 1864.

1995-1996 Protest
In 1994, when the Transvaal Province was dismantled and divided into four provinces, the area from Bushbuckridge to Hazyview was included in Limpopo province. The decision was based on the fact that most of the Bushbuckridge area had been part of three separate bantustans — Gazankulu, Lebowa and KaNgwane — but the bigger sector fell within Gazankulu, which was incorporated into Limpopo. The citizens of Bushbuckridge were unhappy with this arrangement, and became embroiled in a dispute with the government, demanding inclusion of the area in Mpumalanga province. They were concerned that should the area be included into Limpopo, they would be marginalised and suffer poor service delivery since Polokwane, the capital city of Limpopo Province, is more than 300 km away, whereas Nelspruit, the capital of Mpumalanga is only 58 km away. For more than two years the government refused to place Bushbuckridge under Mpumalanga, leading to violent protests and resistance from the community, which included stay-aways, road blocks with burning tyres and destruction of civil and government property.

A decision was taken at Cabinet level in 1998 to transfer the area to Mpumalanga. However, this was not done until 2000, when President Thabo Mbeki and his Cabinet amended the Constitution to legalise the transfer. Because of red tape, it was not until 2005 that Bushbuckridge was officially transferred to Mpumalanga.

Geography
Bushbuckridge is bordered by Mopani District Municipality of Limpopo Province to the north, by Mozambique to the east, by Mbombela and Nkomazi Local Municipality to the south, and by Thaba Chweu and Maruleng Local Municipality to the west.

The 2013 proposal to adjust the border between the municipal area of Mbombela (MP322) and Bushbuckridge Local Municipalities (MP325) was approved for implementation in 2016.

Demographics
The population of the municipality in the 2011 census was 541,248. The most-spoken first language is Tsonga (57%), followed by Northern Sotho with about 25%.

Administrative subdivisions
Bushbuckridge Local Municipality consists of 135 settlements and is divided into thirty-seven wards.

Main places
The 2001 census divided the municipality into the following main places:

Politics 

The municipal council consists of seventy-six members elected by mixed-member proportional representation. Thirty-eight councillors are elected by first-past-the-post voting in thirty-eight wards, while the remaining thirty-eight are chosen from party lists so that the total number of party representatives is proportional to the number of votes received. In the election of 1 November 2021 the African National Congress (ANC) won a majority of fifty-three seats on the council.

The following table shows the results of the election.

References

External links
 Bushbuckridge Local Municipality Official Website

2000 establishments in South Africa
Local municipalities of the Ehlanzeni District Municipality